No. 78 Squadron is located at Agra AFS under Central Air Command. The IL-78s, which refuel at the rate of 500–600 litres a minute, can ferry up to 118 tonnes of fuel, and can simultaneously fill three air-borne fighter aircraft, and allowing the fighters to carry more pay load and penetrate deep into the enemy territories.

History
The No. 78 Squadron were raised in 2003 with Il-78 MKI Aircraft at Agra and moved to the present location. MARS stand for 'Mid Air Refueling Squadron'

Lineage
 Constituted as No. 78 Squadron (Battle-cry) in 2003

Aircraft
Il-78

References

078